Ficus pallida is a species of plant in the family Moraceae. It is found in Brazil, Colombia, and eastern Bolivia. In Bolivia, it is one of a few closely related trees in the genus Ficus popularly known as bibosi.

References

 

pallida
Least concern plants
Trees of Brazil
Trees of Colombia
Trees of Peru
Taxonomy articles created by Polbot